Chowdhury Hasan Sarwardy, Bir Bikram, SBP, ndc, psc is a retired lieutenant general of Bangladesh Army and former commandant of National Defence College. He previously served as GOC of Army Training and Doctrine Command (ARTDOC).

Early life 
He was born in 1960 in Sandwip Thana of Chittagong district.

Training and education 

He was commissioned in the Corps of Infantry on 15 June 1980 with 2nd BMA Long Course.

Sarwardy is a graduate both from Defence Services Command and Staff College and National Defence College. He also obtained LLB degree, Master's degree in defense studies, Master's of security studies, Master's in political science, Master's in business administration and M Phil in national development and security studies. He has also been awarded PhD from Bangladesh University of Professionals.

Career 
Sarwardy commanded an Infantry Battalion, a Rifle Battalion, a Rifle Sector and an Infantry Brigade. He held appointments at both Division and Army Headquarters. He served as Battalion Commander at Bangladesh Military Academy, Director of Operations in former Bangladesh Rifles and Director Military Intelligence Directorate in the Bangladesh Army. He was the Founding Member and Chief Instructor at Non Commissioned Officer Academy. He commanded a Bangladesh army delegation to Fort Benning on 24 July 2014 which was received by Major General Austin S.Miller.

He became a major general in April 2010. After his tenure as DMI (Director Military Intelligence), Sarwardy was appointed as the new DG of Bangladesh Ansar and Village Defence Party Directorate on deputation from the army. Later he was appointed as Vice Chancellor of Bangladesh University of Professionals. He served as Area Commander for Logistic Area Dhaka and Director General of Special Security Force, Prime Minister's Office. He served in the SSF from 27 November 2011 to 10 September 2012. He was commanding the 9th Infantry Division of Bangladesh Army. He was promoted to the rank of Lt. General and made the GOC of Army Training and Doctrine Command (ARTDOC) at the Mymensingh Cantonment. His last command was as a Commandant of National Defense College (NDC) which lead to his retirement. He retired from his active service on 31st May, 2018.

UN Mission 
He was the Founding Member and Pioneer Senior Instructor and Chief Instructor in Bangladesh Institute of Peace Support Operations Training (BIPSOT). He served as an instructor in Switzerland, United States and Nepal to conduct training on United Nations affairs. He also led a delegation of Bangladesh Army for UN training in Nepal in 1999. He served in Mozambique as United Nations Military Observer and Chief of Operations of Bangladesh Contingent in Sierra Leone.

Recognition 

Sarwardy received the gallantry award 'Bir Bikrom' for displaying courage during a counter-insurgency operation in the Chittagong Hill Tracts, in which he captured the enemy camp after he had been shot severely. Bir Bikrom  is the third highest gallantry award in Bangladesh. Hasan led the rescue operation of Tazreen Garments, Savar in December 2012. He led the rescue operation of Rana Plaza in Savar. He received the "Senabahini Padak" (SBP) for his leadership in the rescue operation. Bangladesh broke the record for the largest human flag on 16 December 2013, also led by Hasan. On 26 March 2014 Bangladesh again made a new record by largest number of people singing national anthem at Dhaka led by Hasan Sarwardy.  The two world record went down to Guinness Book. Sarwardy was awarded Bishisto Seba Padak (BSP) for these world records. Lt General Sarwardy headed the writing team of Bangladesh Defence Policy. For his outstanding contribution he was awarded Oshamanno Seba Padak (OSP) by nation. Sarwardy was instrumental and the founding head of most modern Computerized War Game Centre for Bangladesh Army.  Sarwardy was an Adviser of Shornokishoree Network.  For his outstanding performance the organization awarded him as "Shorno Manob" in 2018.

Personal life 

He married twice. His first wife was Farzana Nigar. With whom he has a daughter and a son. After their divorce, he again married Media Personality Farzana Brownia on November, 2018.
He is a founding member of Bogra Golf Club. Bogra Golf Club (BGC) is situated inside Majhira Cantonment on the western side of Dhaka-Bogra highway. It is a 9-hole golf Course of par 36 covering approximately 52.05 acres of land.

Honours

References

Bangladeshi generals
Living people
Recipients of the Bir Bikrom
Bangladesh Army generals
1960 births
People from Sandwip Upazila
Vice-Chancellors of Bangladesh University of Professionals
Mukti Bahini personnel